The 157th Street station is a local station on the IRT Broadway–Seventh Avenue Line of the New York City Subway. Located at the intersection of Broadway and 157th Street in Washington Heights, Manhattan, it is served by the 1 train at all times.

The 157th Street station was constructed for the Interborough Rapid Transit Company (IRT) as part of the city's first subway line, which was approved in 1900. Construction of the line segment that includes 157th Street began on May 14 of the same year. The station held a soft opening on October 29, 1904, and officially opened two weeks later on November 12. The station's platforms were lengthened in 1948, and the station was renovated in the late 20th century.

The 157th Street station contains two side platforms and two tracks. The station was built with tile and mosaic decorations. The platforms contain exits to Broadway's intersection with 157th Street and not connected to each other within fare control.

History

Construction 
Planning for a subway line in New York City dates to 1864. However, development of what would become the city's first subway line did not start until 1894, when the New York State Legislature authorized the Rapid Transit Act. The subway plans were drawn up by a team of engineers led by William Barclay Parsons, chief engineer of the Rapid Transit Commission. It called for a subway line from New York City Hall in lower Manhattan to the Upper West Side, where two branches would lead north into the Bronx. A plan was formally adopted in 1897, and all legal conflicts concerning the route alignment were resolved near the end of 1899.

The Rapid Transit Construction Company, organized by John B. McDonald and funded by August Belmont Jr., signed the initial Contract 1 with the Rapid Transit Commission in February 1900, under which it would construct the subway and maintain a 50-year operating lease from the opening of the line. In 1901, the firm of Heins & LaFarge was hired to design the underground stations. Belmont incorporated the Interborough Rapid Transit Company (IRT) in April 1902 to operate the subway.

The 157th Street station was constructed as part of the IRT's West Side Line (now the Broadway–Seventh Avenue Line) from 133rd Street to a point 100 feet (30 m) north of 182nd Street. Work on this section was conducted by L. B. McCabe & Brother, who started building the tunnel segment on May 14, 1900. The section of the West Side Line around this station was originally planned as a two-track line, but in early 1901, was changed to a three-track structure to permit train storage in the center track. A third track was added directly north of 96th Street, immediately east of the originally planned two tracks.

Opening 
Operation of the first subway began on October 27, 1904, with the opening of the original 28 stations of the New York City Subway from City Hall to 145th Street on the West Side Branch. Two days later, service was extended one stop to 157th Street, which at the time was still incomplete. The station had been soft opened to allow passengers to travel to the Yale–Columbia football game at the Polo Grounds.

157th Street was formally opened on November 12, 1904, as the first extension to the subway. The station's opening had been delayed by two weeks because there was still painting and plastering work going on in the station. 157th Street thus became the terminal for West Side Line trains, relieving congestion at 96th Street, which previously had been the terminus for the IRT's local trains. On March 12, 1906, the IRT was extended from 157th Street to 221st Street. Shuttle trains served the new extension terminating at 157th Street, meaning that passengers south of 157th Street wanting to go to stations on the extension had to transfer at 157th Street. On May 30, 1906, express trains began running through to 221st Street, eliminating the need to transfer at this station.

Station improvements 
After the first subway line was completed in 1908, the station was served by West Side local and express trains. Express trains began at South Ferry in Manhattan or Atlantic Avenue in Brooklyn, and ended at 242nd Street in the Bronx. Local trains ran from City Hall to 242nd Street during rush hours, continuing south from City Hall to South Ferry at other times. In 1918, the Broadway–Seventh Avenue Line opened south of Times Square–42nd Street, thereby dividing the original line into an "H"-shaped system. The original subway north of Times Square thus became part of the Broadway–Seventh Avenue Line. Local trains were sent to South Ferry, while express trains used the new Clark Street Tunnel to Brooklyn.

To address overcrowding, in 1909, the New York Public Service Commission proposed lengthening platforms at stations along the original IRT subway. As part of a modification to the IRT's construction contracts, made on January 18, 1910, the company was to lengthen station platforms to accommodate ten-car express and six-car local trains. In addition to $1.5 million (equivalent to $ million in ) spent on platform lengthening, $500,000 was spent on building additional entrances and exits. It was anticipated that these improvements would increase capacity by 25 percent. Six-car local trains began operating in October 1910, and ten-car express trains began running on the West Side Line on January 24, 1911. Subsequently, the station could accommodate six-car local trains, but ten-car trains could not open some of their doors.

Work to construct new entrances at the station was 49 percent completed in Fiscal Year 1924.

The city government took over the IRT's operations on June 12, 1940. A contract for the platform extensions at 157th Street and eight other stations on the line was awarded to Spencer, White & Prentis Inc. in October 1946. The platform extensions at these stations were opened in stages. On April 6, 1948, the platform extension at 157th Street opened. At the same time, the IRT routes were given numbered designations with the introduction of "R-type" rolling stock, which contained rollsigns with numbered designations for each service. The route to 242nd Street became known as the 1. In 1959, all 1 trains became local.

Station layout

This station was part of the original subway, and has two side platforms and two tracks. The 1 stops here at all times.

The platform extensions are at the rear ends of the original platforms: the southbound platform was extended northward and the northbound platform was extended southward.

Design
As with other stations built as part of the original IRT, the station was constructed using a cut-and-cover method. The tunnel is covered by a "U"-shaped trough that contains utility pipes and wires. Each platform consists of  concrete slabs, beneath which are drainage basins. The original platforms contain I-beam columns spaced every . Additional columns between the tracks, spaced every , support the jack-arched concrete station roofs. The tiled columns that run along the entire length and contain "157" painted in black. Some of the columns between the tracks have "157" signs in black lettering on white borders. There is a  gap between the trough wall and the platform walls, which are made of -thick brick covered over by a tiled finish.

The decorative scheme consists of blue/green tile tablets; buff tile bands; a green terracotta cornice; and buff terracotta plaques. The mosaic tiles at all original IRT stations were manufactured by the American Encaustic Tile Company, which subcontracted the installations at each station. The decorative work was performed by tile contractor Manhattan Glass Tile Company and terracotta contractor Atlantic Terra Cotta Company. The platforms contain their original trim line that includes "157" mosaics and name tablets reading "157TH ST." There are also directional signs on the tiles containing white lettering on a black background and brown border.

Exits
Each platform has one same-level fare control area near the middle. Both are fully staffed, containing a turnstile bank and token booth, and each has two street stairs. The northbound side's two exits lead to the southeast corner of 157th Street and Broadway, and the southbound side's two exits lead to the northwest corner of the intersection. There are no crossovers or crossunders to allow free transfers between directions. Only the South Ferry-bound side token booth is staffed.

References

External links 

 
 Station Reporter – 1 Train
 The Subway Nut – 157th Street Pictures 
 157th Street downtown entrance from Google Maps Street View
 157th Street uptown entrance from Google Maps Street View
 Platforms from Google Maps Street View

IRT Broadway–Seventh Avenue Line stations
Washington Heights, Manhattan
Broadway (Manhattan)
New York City Subway stations in Manhattan
Railway stations in the United States opened in 1904
1904 establishments in New York City